International Headquarters may refer to:

Boeing International Headquarters in Chicago
International Headquarters of The Salvation Army in London
Gold Base, headquarters of the Church of Scientology in Riverside County, California
MasterCard International Global Headquarters in Harrison, New York
Novus International Headquarters in St. Louis, Missouri
Reynolds Metals Company International Headquarters in Richmond, Virginia